Peter Howard may refer to:

Peter Howard (politician) (1772–1843), Canadian businessman and politician
Peter Howard (journalist) (1908–1965), British journalist and leader of Moral Re-Armament
Peter Howard (conductor) (1927–2008), Broadway conductor and dance music arranger
Peter Howard (RAF officer) (1925–2007)
Peter Howard (Medal of Honor) (1829–1875), American Civil War sailor and Medal of Honor recipient
Pete Howard, drummer of The Clash
Peter Howard, pseudonym for the American screenwriter Howard Koch